Admiral Sir James Henry Fuller Eberle,  (31 May 1927 – 17 May 2018) was a senior officer in the Royal Navy who served as Commander-in-Chief Fleet from 1979 until 1981.

Naval career
Educated at Clifton College and the Royal Naval College, Dartmouth, Eberle was commissioned into the Royal Navy in 1941. He served in the Second World War.

Eberle was promoted to rear admiral in 1971 and was appointed Assistant Chief of Fleet Support the following year. He became Flag Officer Sea Training in 1974, Flag Officer Aircraft Carriers and Amphibious Ships in 1975 and Chief of Fleet Support in 1977. He went on to be Commander-in-Chief Fleet in 1979 and Commander-in-Chief Naval Home Command in 1981; he retired in 1982.

Later life
In retirement Eberle became Director of the Royal Institute for International Affairs. He was also Rear Admiral and then Vice-Admiral of the United Kingdom and became Master of the Britannia Beagles hunt.

Personal life
In 1950 Eberle married Ann Patricia Thompson; they went on to have one son, Peter, and two daughters, Susan and Sarah. Eberle died in May 2018 at the age of 90.

References

Sources
 Eberle, James From Greenland's Icy Shore, Roundtuit Publishing, 2007; 

|-

|-

|-

|-

|-

1927 births
2018 deaths
Graduates of Britannia Royal Naval College
Knights Grand Cross of the Order of the Bath
People educated at Clifton College
Royal Navy admirals
Royal Navy officers of World War II
Members of the Society of Merchant Venturers